The Lost Tribes is an Australian reality television series produced by the Nine Network. The series premiere was broadcast on Sunday, 6 May 2007 at 6:30pm, prior to the telecast of the 2007 TV Week Logie Awards. The show is narrated by Charles Wooley.

The series places two families from Sydney and one family from Melbourne with indigenous tribal communities in South Africa, Namibia, and Indonesia. The series aims to document the culture shock each family goes through in their new environment.

External links
 

Nine Network original programming
2000s Australian reality television series
2007 Australian television series debuts
2007 Australian television series endings